Martin Mwamba (born 6 November 1964) is a Zambian footballer. He played in two matches for the Zambia national football team in 1994. He was also named in Zambia's squad for the 1994 African Cup of Nations tournament.

References

1964 births
Living people
Zambian footballers
Zambia international footballers
1994 African Cup of Nations players
Place of birth missing (living people)
Association football goalkeepers